The Dionysus Sardanapalus is an uncommon Hellenistic-Roman Neo Attic sculpture-type of the god Dionysus, misnamed after the king Sardanapalus. Unlike most contemporary figurations of Dionysus as a lithe youth, the self-consciously archaising god is heavily draped, with an ivy wreath and a long archaic-style beard; probably he bore a thyrsos in a raised right hand, now missing.

The misidentification with Sardanapalus was erroneously confirmed in the example in the Vatican Museums, which was provided in antiquity with an inscription that reads ϹΑΡΔΑΝΑΠΑΛΛΟϹ (Sardanapalus), giving the type its erroneous name (it has no true association with this legendary king).  It was also restored with a modern thyrsus in wood and iron.

In the early 19th century, Ennio Quirino Visconti cogently argued, against Johann Joachim Winckelmann and other earlier antiquarians, that the "Sardanapalus" of the Museo Pio-Clementino was in fact a Dionysus.

All the surviving Hellenistic-Roman variants are copied from a Greek original of about 325 BC.  The type first occurred at a time when the god's iconography was otherwise changing to a largely youthful and effeminate physical type (as seen, for example, here). The Romans elaborated the Sardanapalus type further, often showing the god with subsidiary figures.  Though the type appears restrained, multiple copies of a popular relief sculpture exist with a figure of the same type, but drunk and propped up by a satyr.

Examples
Fragments successively excavated at the Theatre of Dionysus, Athens.
Herakleion Archaeological Museum, small marble copy, 2nd - 3rd c. AD from Knossos
Naples'
Palermo'
Uffizi, Florence.
Another example of the type is a Roman marble, about AD 40–60, in the British Museum; it was carved in a single large block of Pentelic marble, except for the missing right arm, which was made separately and attached.  It is said to have been found at Posillipo, Campania, Italy.  Height: 2.2 m.  From the Castellani Collection.  GR 1878.11-6.1 (Sculpture 1606) 
National Museum of Rome

In Oliver Stone's biopic Alexander (2004), Dionysus is shown on-screen as bearded, longhaired, crowned with ivy, and draped in a lion skin and voluminous chiton, in a variation on this "Sardanapalus" statue type.

Notes

320s BC establishments
Sardanapalus
Collections of the National Roman Museum
Sculptures of the Vatican Museums
Ancient Greek and Roman sculptures in the British Museum
Neo-Attic sculptures
Archaeological discoveries in Italy
Sardanapalus